Shum Shuk-yee, better known by her stage name Dana, was a Hong Kong former actress who was active under Shaw Brothers Studio in the 1970s. She was best known for her roles in most of the Shaw Brothers erotic films and also for her roles in films such as The Super Inframan and Girl with the Long Hair.

Background
Born in Nanhai District, Guangdong, Shum Shuk-Yee moved to Hong Kong and joined the Shaw Brothers Studio acting school. By the age of 20 years old she was graduated as a basic actress. She made her first acting appearance in a minor role in the 1973 erotic women in prison film  The Bamboo House of Dolls. She later adopted the stage name Dana based on her lead role from 1975 film Girl With the Long Hair. She had since retired from acting by the end of 1979.

Filmography
 The Bamboo House of Dolls (1973) - prisoner beaten to death with whip
Sex For Sale (1974)
 Forbidden Tales of Two Cities (1975)
The Happy Trio (1975) - Shan Shan
The Empress Dowager (1975)
Return of the Crazy Bumpkin (1975) - [deleted scene]
 Big Brother Cheng (1975)
The Super Inframan (1975) - Witch Eye
The Taxi Driver (1975) - Guang's horny passenger
Fearful Interlude (1975) - Miss Peifang
Black Magic (1975) - Mistress cursed by Shan's patron #1
 Thief of Thieves (1975) - Chai's clan member
Girl with the Long Hair (1975) - Dana
Beautiful Vixen (1976) - Mrs. Wu
Love Swindler (1976) - Miss Anna
The Scoundrel (1977) - Sophia
Deadly Angels (1977) - Lu-Pin
Cobra Girl (1977) - Man-Ling
The Discharged (1977) - Sister [uncredited]
Edge of Fury (1978) - Mrs Chun
Golgo 13: Assignment Kowloon (1978) - Leika
Bruce Lee in New Guinea (1978) - Princess Ankawa
The Image of Bruce Lee (1978) - Donna : Agent Seven
Spiteful Women (1978)
Worldly Foursome (1979) - Fong Pui-pui

References

External links
 

Living people
Cantonese people
Hong Kong people
Hong Kong film actresses
20th-century Hong Kong actresses
Shaw Brothers Studio
Year of birth missing (living people)
Chinese emigrants to British Hong Kong